John McLaughlin (born 25 February 1952) is an English former professional footballer who played as a midfielder. Active in England and the United States between 1970 and 1976, McLaughlin made 72 career League appearances, scoring 9 goals.

Career
Born in Liverpool, McLaughlin played as a youth with hometown club Liverpool, before making his professional debut in 1970. He made a total of 40 appearances for Liverpool in the Football League between 1970 and 1976. McLaughlin made five appearances on loan at Portsmouth in 1976. McLaughlin also spent time in the North American Soccer League with the Philadelphia Atoms and the Dallas Tornado.

After a knee injury ended his professional career, McLaughlin later played non-League football for teams including South Liverpool, Barrow and Wrexham.

References

1952 births
Living people
English footballers
Footballers from Liverpool
Association football midfielders
Liverpool F.C. players
Philadelphia Atoms players
Portsmouth F.C. players
Dallas Tornado players
South Liverpool F.C. players
Barrow A.F.C. players
Wrexham A.F.C. players
Macclesfield Town F.C. players
English Football League players
North American Soccer League (1968–1984) players
English expatriate sportspeople in the United States
Expatriate soccer players in the United States
English expatriate footballers